Poltava Oblast is subdivided into districts (raions) which are subdivided into territorial communities (hromadas).

Current

On 18 July 2020, the number of districts was reduced to four. These are:
 Kremenchuk (Кременчуцький район), the center is in the town of Kremenchuk;
 Lubny (Лубенський район), the center is in the town of Lubny; 
 Myrhorod (Миргородський район), the center is in the town of Myrhorod;
 Poltava (Полтавський район), the center is in the city of Poltava.

Administrative divisions until 2020

Before 2020, Poltava Oblast was subdivided into 31 regions: 24 districts (raions) and 6 city municipalities (mis'krada or misto), officially known as territories governed by city councils.

Cities under the oblast's jurisdiction:
Poltava (Полтава), the administrative center of the oblast
Hadiach (Гадяч)
Horishni Plavni (Горішні Плавні), formerly Komsomolsk
Kremenchuk (Кременчук)
Lubny (Лубни)
Myrhorod (Миргород)
Districts (raions):
Chornukhy (Чорнухинський район)
Urban-type settlements under the district's jurisdiction:
Chornukhy (Чорнухи)
Chutove (Чутівський район)
Urban-type settlements under the district's jurisdiction:
Chutove (Чутове)
Skorokhodove (Скороходове), formerly Artemivka
Dykanka (Диканський район)
Urban-type settlements under the district's jurisdiction:
Dykanka (Диканька)
Hadiach (Гадяцький район)
Hlobyne (Глобинський район)
Cities and towns under the district's jurisdiction:
Hlobyne (Глобине)
Urban-type settlements under the district's jurisdiction:
Hradyzk (Градизьк)
Hrebinka (Гребінківський район)
Cities and towns under the district's jurisdiction:
Hrebinka (Гребінка)
Karlivka (Карлівський район)
Cities and towns under the district's jurisdiction:
Karlivka (Карлівка)
Khorol (Хорольський район)
Cities and towns under the district's jurisdiction:
Khorol (Хорол)
Kobeliaky (Кобеляцький район)
Cities and towns under the district's jurisdiction:
Kobeliaky (Кобеляки)
Urban-type settlements under the district's jurisdiction:
Bilyky (Білики)
Kotelva (Котелевський район)
Urban-type settlements under the district's jurisdiction:
Kotelva (Котельва)
Kozelshchyna (Козельщинський район)
Urban-type settlements under the district's jurisdiction:
Kozelshchyna (Козельщина)
Nova Haleshchyna (Нова Галещина)
Kremenchuk (Кременчуцький район)
Lokhvitsia (Лохвицький район)
Cities and towns under the district's jurisdiction:
Lokhvytsia (Лохвиця)
Zavodske (Заводське), formerly Chervonozavodske
Lubny (Лубенський район)
Mashivka (Машівський район)
Urban-type settlements under the district's jurisdiction:
Mashivka (Машівка)
Myrhorod (Миргородський район)
Urban-type settlements under the district's jurisdiction:
Komyshnia (Комишня)
Romodan (Ромодан)
Novi Sanzhary (Новосанжарський район)
Urban-type settlements under the district's jurisdiction:
Novi Sanzhary (Нові Санжари)
Orzhytsia (Оржицький район)
Urban-type settlements under the district's jurisdiction:
Novoorzhytske (Новооржицьке)
Orzhytsia (Оржиця)
Poltava (Полтавський район)
Pyriatyn (Пирятинський район)
Cities and towns under the district's jurisdiction:
Pyriatyn (Пирятин)
Reshetylivka (Решетилівський район)
Urban-type settlements under the district's jurisdiction:
Reshetylivka (Решетилівка)
Semenivka (Семенівський район)
Urban-type settlements under the district's jurisdiction:
Semenivka (Семенівка)
Shyshaky (Шишацький район)
Urban-type settlements under the district's jurisdiction:
Shyshaky (Шишаки)
Velyka Bahachka (Великобагачанський район)
Urban-type settlements under the district's jurisdiction:
Hoholeve (Гоголеве)
Velyka Bahachka (Велика Багачка)
Zinkiv (Зіньківський район)
Cities and towns under the district's jurisdiction:
Zinkiv (Зіньків)
Urban-type settlements under the district's jurisdiction:
Opishnia (Опішня)

References

Poltava
Poltava Oblast